Earle Clark Reoch (5 March 1942 — 1 December 1989) was a Scottish first-class cricketer and solicitor.

Reoch was born at Monifieth in March 1942. He was educated at the High School of Dundee, before matriculating to the University of St Andrews. Reoch played club cricketer for both Forfarshire and Perthshire, with him captaining Forfarshire in 1968, 1971 and 1976. He made a single appearance in first-class cricket for Scotland against Ireland at Cork in 1973. Batting twice in the match, he was dismissed in Scotland's first innings without scoring by Gerry Duffy, while in their second innings he was dismissed for 3 runs by Dermott Monteith. In the same year he also played in matches against Essex and the touring New Zealanders, though neither match carried first-class status. Outside of cricket, he was a solicitor by profession. Reoch suffered a heart attack at his Broughty Ferry home on 30 November 1989 and died the following day at Ninewells Hospital in Dundee.

References

External links
 

1942 births
1989 deaths
People from Monifieth
People educated at the High School of Dundee
Alumni of the University of St Andrews
Scottish solicitors
Scottish cricketers